Makyam Naga (Lasam, Macham Naga, Makyan, Pongnyun, Paung Nyuan) is a Sino-Tibetan language spoken in Burma. It is closely related to other Konyak languages.

Classification
Makyam belongs to the Khiamniungic subgroup within the Konyak–Chang group of languages (Naw Sawu 2016:6). It is closely related to Leinong than to Khiamniungan.

Khiamniungic
Khiamniungan Naga
Leinong-Makyam
Leinong Naga
Makyam Naga

Distribution
Makyam is spoken in 13 villages of northeast Lahe Township and Hkamti Township, Sagaing Division, Myanmar (Ethnologue). Main dialect variation is between the western Makyan villages and Kuku villages.

Makyam is spoken in the following 18 villages, which are located just to the east of Lahe town in Lahe Township, Sagaing Division, Myanmar. They add up to a total of 1,026 households and 4,994 persons (Naw Sawu 2016:8). Old village names are given in parentheses.

San Tong (Nouk Hai)
Makyam (Ngaung Ke)
Kha Lai (Khun Old Kha Lai)
New Kha Lai (Pyan Kha Lai)
Long Khin (Long Nouk)
Lun Htaung
Wutha (Zay Tam Nouk)
Kuku Nokkon (Khaunouk Hai)
Myang Kuku (Khaunouk Suam)
Ahang Kuku
Taw Law (New Wutha)
Pin Htaung Lon Shout
Lepandar
Zi Phyu Kone, Kham Ti Township
Sin Te
Ma Kyam Kha
Lahe
Ma Kaw Rain

The majority of Makyam speakers can also speak Leinong, as the two languages are spoken in the same area (Naw Sawu 2016:10).

References

Further reading 
Naw Sawu. 2016. Descriptive Phonology of Makyam Naga. M.A. dissertation. Chiang Mai: Payap University.
 Numerals in Makyam

Sal languages
Languages of Myanmar